Clifton Knolls-Mill Creek is a census-designated place (CDP) within the town of Clifton Park, Saratoga County, New York, United States. It was first listed as a CDP prior to the 2020 census.

The community is in southern Saratoga County, southeast of the center of Clifton Park. It is bordered to the north by Clifton Park Center Road, to the east by Moe Road, to the south by Grooms Road, and to the west by Vischer Ferry Road. The CDP of Clifton Gardens borders Clifton Knolls-Mill Creek to the east across Moe Road. The hamlet of Clifton Park Center is at the northwestern corner of the CDP.

Demographics

References 

Census-designated places in Saratoga County, New York
Census-designated places in New York (state)